Ajdir (Berber: ⴰⵊⴷⵉⵔ) is a small town in northern Morocco, on the Mediterranean coast, near Al Hoceima. It was the capital of the Republic of the Rif from 1922-1925 under the leadership of Abd el-Krim (d.1963) who born there in 1880. The town lies in the territory of the Ait Waryagher tribe.

See also
Aith Ouriaghel

External links
City Of Alhoceima Website (English)

Populated places in Al Hoceïma Province
Rif
Rif War
Capitals of former nations